Brevik is a locality situated in Lidingö Municipality, Stockholm County, Sweden with 8,772 inhabitants in 2010.

References 

Populated places in Lidingö Municipality